Intrude may refer to:

 Intrusive rock
 "Intrude", a song from Ring (Gary Burton album), 1974